The United States District Court for the District of Idaho (in case citations, D. Idaho) is the Federal district court whose jurisdiction comprises the state of Idaho (except for the part of the state within Yellowstone National Park, which is under the jurisdiction of the United States District Court for the District of Wyoming). Court is held in Boise, Coeur d'Alene, and Pocatello. Cases from the District of Idaho are appealed to the United States Court of Appeals for the Ninth Circuit (except for patent claims and claims against the U.S. government under the Tucker Act, which are appealed to the Federal Circuit).

The United States Attorney's Office for the District of Idaho represents the United States in civil and criminal litigation in the court.  the U.S. attorney for the District of Idaho is Joshua Hurwit.

History 
The District of Idaho was established shortly after Idaho's admission as a U.S. State.

Current judges 
:

Vacancies and pending nominations

Former judges

Chief judges

Succession of seats

See also 
 Courts of Idaho
 List of United States federal courthouses in Idaho
 United States Court of Appeals for the Ninth Circuit

Notes

External links 
 United States District Court for the District of Idaho Official Website
 United States Attorney for the District of Idaho Official Website

Idaho
Idaho law
Boise, Idaho
Coeur d'Alene, Idaho
Latah County, Idaho
Pocatello, Idaho
Courthouses in Idaho
1890 establishments in Idaho
Courts and tribunals established in 1890